Dorcadion leopardinum is a species of beetle in the family Cerambycidae. It was described by Plavilstshikov in 1937. It is known from China.

See also 
 Dorcadion

References

leopardinum
Beetles described in 1937